Jimmy McClain (July 23, 1980 – February 22, 2013) was a former American football linebacker who played three seasons in the National Football League with the Houston Texans and Jacksonville Jaguars. He played college football at Troy State University and attended Enterprise High School in Enterprise, Alabama. He was also a member of the Scottish Claymores of NFL Europe.

On February 22, 2013, McClain was shot to death in his home by his stepson, Dwayne Moore. Moore received a sentence of 22 years in prison for the murder.

Professional career

Houston Texans
McClain was signed by the Houston Texans on April 23, 2002. He was released by the Texans on September 2, 2003 and re-signed on September 10, 2003. He was released by the Texans on November 17, 2003. McClain was credited with a safety on December 15, 2002 against the Baltimore Ravens. On December 22, 2002 against the Washington Redskins, he became the first person in Houston Texans history to block a punt.

Jacksonville Jaguars/Scottish Claymores
McClain was signed by the Jacksonville Jaguars on January 27, 2004. He was allocated to the Scottish Claymores for the 2004 season. He was named to the All-NFL Europe League Team in 2004. McClain was released by the Jaguars on September 4, 2004. He was signed by the Jaguars on November 10 and released on November 30, 2004. He was signed by the Jaguars on August 13 and released on August 27, 2005. He was re-signed by the Jaguars on August 31 and released on September 3, 2005.

References

External links
Just Sports Stats
NFL Draft Scout

Living people
1980 births
Players of American football from Alabama
American football linebackers
African-American players of American football
Troy Trojans football players
Houston Texans players
Jacksonville Jaguars players
Scottish Claymores players
People from Enterprise, Alabama
21st-century African-American sportspeople
20th-century African-American people